Nasinu F.C. is a Fijian football team playing in the first division of the Fiji Football Association competitions. It is based in Nasinu, which is situated on the eastern side of the main island of Viti Levu, between the town of Nausori and the city of Suva. Their home stadium is Rishikul College Grounds. Their uniform is blue shirt, maroon shorts and blue socks. The club lost to Savusavu F.C in promotion and relegation 2010.

History  
Nasinu F.A. was founded in 1976, with the formation of the Nasinu Football Association, to cater for the expanding population of the Nasinu area. Its first president was Subhas Maharaj.  The team began its debut in the second division but soon moved up to the first division, where it has performed credibly. In 1995/96 Nasinu was coached by ex-English professional player Terry O'Donnell, who was also previously the successful Vanuatu National coach. Despite being in the last place of the national league and facing relegation in 1995 when he took over, the team performed admirably under O'Donnell to win the last 6 games and force a promotion-relegation playoff with Savusavu FC, which it won convincingly. The next season the club climbed the league Table to finish a credible 4th and also became runner-up in the IDC.

Current squad 
Squad for 2020 Fiji Premier League

Personnel

Current technical staff

Achievements  
League Championship (for Districts):  :Winner: 0 :Runner-up: 0 
 Inter-District Championship:  :Winner:  1990 :Runner-up:  1988, 1993, 1996 
Battle of the Giants:  :Winner: 0 :Runner-up:  1989, 1991 
Fiji Football Association Cup Tournament:  :Winner: 0 :Runner-up:  2002

See also 

Fiji Football Association

References

Bibliography  
 M. Prasad, Sixty Years of Soccer in Fiji 1938 – 1998: The Official History of the Fiji Football Association, Fiji Football Association, Suva, 1998. 
 
Football clubs in Fiji 
1976 establishments in Fiji